In the geologic timescale, the Wuchiapingian or Wujiapingian (from  in the Liangshan area of Hanzhong, Shaanxi Province) is an age or stage of the Permian. It is also the lower or earlier of two subdivisions of the Lopingian Epoch or Series. It was preceded by the Capitanian and followed by the Changhsingian.

Regional stages with which the Wuchiapingian is coeval or overlaps include the Djulfian or Dzhulfian, Longtanian, Rustlerian, Saladoan, and Castilian.

Stratigraphic definitions
The Wuchiapingian was first used in 1962, when the Lopingian Series of southwestern China was divided in the Changhsingian and Wuchiapingian Formations. In 1973 the Wuchiapingian was first used as a chronostratigraphic unit (i.e. a stage, as opposed to a formation, which is a lithostratigraphic unit).

The base of the Wuchiapingian Stage is defined as the place in the stratigraphic record where the conodont species Clarkina postbitteri postbitteri first appears. A global reference profile for this boundary (a GSSP) is located near Laibin in the Chinese province of Guangxi.

The top of the Wuchiapingian (the base of the Changhsingian) is at the first appearance of conodont species Clarkina wangi.

The Wuchiapingian contains two ammonite biozones: that of the genus Araxoceras and that of the genera Roadoceras and Doulingoceras.

Biodiversity
An extinction pulse occurred during the Wuchiapingian; faunas were recovering when another larger extinction pulse, the Permian–Triassic extinction event devastated life.

Wuchiapingian life

Chondrichthyans

Actinopterygians

Coelacanths

†Temnospondyls

†Chroniosuchians

†Seymouriamorphs

†Procolophonomorphs

Eureptiles

Diapsids

Archosauromorphs

Synapsids

Therapsids

References

External links
 GeoWhen Database - Wuchiapingian
 Upper Paleozoic stratigraphic chart at the website of the subcommission for stratigraphic information of the ICS

 
Permian geochronology
.
Lopingian
Hanzhong
Paleontology in Shaanxi
Permian Asia